KRNL-FM (89.7 FM) was a radio station licensed to Mount Vernon, Iowa, United States. The station was owned by Cornell College and provided a creative, insightful outlook to Cornell student listeners, the surrounding community, and web listeners around the country. KRNL-FM was silent during the summers.

KRNL-FM's license was cancelled by the Federal Communications Commission on September 10, 2020.

References

External links

RNL-FM
Radio stations established in 1973
1973 establishments in Iowa
Radio stations disestablished in 2020
2020 disestablishments in Iowa
Defunct mass media in Iowa
Defunct radio stations in the United States
RNL-FM